Jo Bun-hui (born 29 November 1979) is a North Korean long-distance runner who specializes in the marathon. Her personal best time is 2:27:22 hours, achieved at the 2006 Pyongyang Marathon.

She competed at the 2004 and 2008 Olympic Games. She also won the silver medals in the 10,000 metres at the 2002 Asian Championships and the half marathon at the 2003 Summer Universiade, as well as the bronze medal in the 10,000 metres at the 2007 Summer Universiade. She finished fourth at the 2006 Asian Games and won the 2006 Pyongyang Marathon.

Achievements

References

1979 births
Living people
North Korean female long-distance runners
North Korean female marathon runners
Athletes (track and field) at the 2004 Summer Olympics
Athletes (track and field) at the 2008 Summer Olympics
Olympic athletes of North Korea
Athletes (track and field) at the 2006 Asian Games
Universiade medalists in athletics (track and field)
Universiade silver medalists for North Korea
Universiade bronze medalists for North Korea
Asian Games competitors for North Korea
Medalists at the 2003 Summer Universiade
Medalists at the 2007 Summer Universiade
20th-century North Korean women
21st-century North Korean women